

Events
Paddy "the Bear" Ryan, leader of the Valley Gang, is killed by Walter "The Runt" Quinlan.
February 3 – Chicago labor racketeer Maurice Enright is killed. Timothy D. "Big Tim" Murphy is suspected in his slaying, but is released for lack of evidence. Although suspected by authorities to have involved the Torrio-Capone organization, Chicago labor union racketeer James Vinci is eventually convicted of his murder.
April 15 – The Slater and Morrill Shoe Company in Braintree, Massachusetts is robbed of $15,776 ($ million today) as a paymaster and guard are killed, supposedly by the Morelli Gang of Providence, Rhode Island, however Nicola Sacco and Bartolomeo Vanzetti are convicted of the robbery and executed in 1927.
May 11 – Chicago gambling racketeer James "Big Jim" Colosimo is killed outside his restaurant, allegedly by Al Capone.
August – In a daring daylight robbery, Timothy D. "Big Tim" Murphy and his gang rob a mail train of $400,000 ($ million today). Murphy is indicted in February 1921, and convicted in November 1922.
December 26 – Monk Eastman is killed by a corrupt Prohibition agent.
Giuseppe Masseria assumes control of the New York City Morello Gang.

Births
Matthew Joseph "Matty the Horse" Ianniello, loan shark and labor union racketeer for the Genovese crime family
April 13 – Roberto Calvi, Banco Ambrosiano chairman and mafia associate
May 8 – Michele Sindona, Italian mason and mafia associate
September 27 – Carlo Alberto dalla Chiesa, Italian carabinieri general, murdered in Palermo in 1982, for leading the effort to stop the violence of the Second Mafia War.

Deaths
Paddy "the Bear" Ryan, Valley Gang leader
February 3 – Maurice Enright, Chicago labor racketeer
May 11 – Jim Colosimo "Big Jim", Chicago prostitution and gambling racketeer
December 26 – Monk Eastman (Edward Osterman), Eastman Gang founder

References 

Organized crime
Years in organized crime